The 2016–17 Bonaire League or known locally as the 2016–17 Kampionato is the 48th season of the Bonaire League. The first phase of the season began on 21 October 2016 and ended on 21 May 2017. The regular stage of the season culminated with the Kaya 6 tournament, which the top six teams partook in to determine the overall champion. The Kaya 6 will begin on 11 June 2017 and end on 14 July 2017.

Atlétiko Flamingo entered the season as the defending champions. The club finished sixth in the regular season, but may still win the league if they win the Kaya 6.

Clubs 

Nine clubs participated in the league for the 2016–17 season.

Table

Regular season

Kaya 6

Kaya 4

Final

References 

Bonaire League seasons
Bonaire
football
football